Anja Daniela Wagner (born 11 March 1969, in Halle/Saale) is a German operatic mezzo-soprano and photographer.

Life and work 
With Cornelia Melian from Munich, she also received training in "historical singing" in early music. After graduating, she completed postgraduate studies at the Hochschule für Musik Carl Maria von Weber in Dresden. Her teacher there was Hartmut Zabel. This was followed by master classes with Jessica Cash, Hermann Christian Polster and chamber music singer Brigitte Fassbaender.

Wagner gave her debut on the opera stage during her studies as Hansel in E. Humperdinck's Hänsel und Gretel at the Zwickau theatre.

As in the film, the opera is based on the novel by Ulrich Plenzdorf. She sang a.o. Carmen in Carmen, Dorabella in Così fan tutte, Olga in Eugene Onegin, Flora Bervoix in La Traviata, Anita in West Side Story, Nehebka in Aida and the Countess in Der Wildschütz by Albert Lortzing at the Nordhausen and Meiningen theatres

Her activity in the singing of oratorios is manifold.

In the CD production of the liturgical movements by Hugo Distler she was awarded the German Record Prize "Echo Klassik" as soloist for the alto voice in 2001.

In 2017 she received the 11th Nordhäuser Theater Prize, an award for special artistic achievements. It is a foundation of the Kreissparkasse Nordhausen.

References

External links 
 Anja Daniela Wagner on DNB
 Anja Daniela Wagner Homepage
 Anja Daniela Wagner on Operabase
 Anja Daniela Wagner on the site of the Theater Nordhausen

German operatic mezzo-sopranos
1969 births
Living people
Halle Saale